Albagiara, is a comune (municipality) in the Province of Oristano in the Italian region Sardinia, located about  northwest of Cagliari and about  southeast of Oristano.

Albagiara borders the following municipalities: Ales, Assolo, Genoni, Gonnosnò, Mogorella, Usellus, Villa Sant'Antonio. The economy is based on agriculture and woodcraft.

References

Cities and towns in Sardinia